Greektown is a general name for an ethnic enclave populated primarily by Greeks or people of Greek ancestry, usually in an urban neighborhood.

History 

The oldest Greek dominated neighborhood outside of Greece were probably the Fener in Istanbul, or the Ash Shatibi in Alexandria.

In Vienna, for many centuries, the Griechenviertel (Greek quarter) existed in the Innere Stadt (inner town). Later the Greek community moved to other newer quarters. A traditional Austrian restaurant there is called Griechenbeisl (Greek tavern) and a street Griechengasse (Greek lane).

Greektowns by location

In Canada
Greektown, Montreal, Quebec
Greektown Park Avenue, Montreal, Quebec
Greektown Park Extension, Montreal, Quebec
Greektown Chomedey, Laval, Quebec
Greektown, Toronto, Ontario
Greektown, Vancouver, British Columbia

The following pages provide some history regarding certain Greek communities in Canada.

Greek Canadians
Greek Canadians in the Greater Toronto Area

In the United States

A typical housing pattern found in United States' Greektowns is to buy a multiple story dwelling, move into the lower floor and rent the upper floors to other Greeks.

The largest Greek community in the USA is located in Queens, NY.
Astoria, Queens, in New York City

List of officially designated Greektowns:
Greektown, Chicago
Greektown, Detroit
Greektown, Baltimore
Greektown, Tarpon Springs

List of communities with a large concentration of Greek communities:
New England
Boston, Massachusetts
Lynn, Massachusetts
Lowell, Massachusetts
Manchester, New Hampshire
New York
8th avenue, Manhattan
Washington Heights, Manhattan

List of historic Greektowns:
Philadelphia
Philadelphia, Pennsylvania
Upper Darby, Pennsylvania
Pittsburgh, Pennsylvania
Cleveland, Ohio
Campbell, Ohio
Salt Lake City, Utah
San Francisco, California
Los Angeles, California

The following pages provide some history regarding certain Greek communities in the USA.
Greek Americans
Greeks in Syracuse, New York
Greeks in Omaha, Nebraska
History of the Greek Americans in Metro Detroit

List of Greek Americans

In Australia
The term Greektown is not widely used in Australia, even in areas with comparatively high levels of Greek concentration. In the 1860s, a shanty town referred to as Greektown was established at Tambaroora near Bathurst in New South Wales. and there is the Greek Precinct, Melbourne

The following pages provide some history regarding certain Greek communities in Australia.

Greek Australians
Greek community of Melbourne

In the United Kingdom
Palmers Green, London
Many Greeks reside in Wood Green, Harringay and Palmers Green, the latter harbouring the largest community of Greek-Cypriots outside Cyprus, resulting in these areas bearing local nicknames whereby the Green is replaced by Greek – as in Greek Lanes and Palmers Greek. Although in recent years, most of London's Greek and Greek-Cypriot population resides in Southgate.

Bayswater is also home to a substantial Greek community. The Saint Sophia Cathedral, situated on Moscow Road was built in 1882, and is a grade I listed building.

The following pages provide some history regarding certain Greek communities in the UK.
Greeks in the United Kingdom

In Armenia
Yaghdan, Lori Province, Armenia
Madan, Alaverdi, Armenia

References

External links
Hellenic Home for the Aged
Anti-Greek Riots

See also 
 Greek diaspora 
 Ethnic enclave

Greek culture